The 1974 NCAA Men's Division I Swimming and Diving Championships were contested in March 1974 at the Belmont Plaza Pool at California State University, Long Beach in Long Beach, California at the 51st annual NCAA-sanctioned swim meet to determine the team and individual national champions of Division I men's collegiate swimming and diving in the United States. 

This was the first championship after the NCAA renamed the former University Division to the present Division I.

USC returned to the top the team standings (after having finished second to Indiana each of the previous four years), the Trojans' sixth overall title (and first since 1966).

Team standings
Note: Top 10 only
(H) = Hosts
(DC) = Defending champions
Full results

See also
List of college swimming and diving teams

References

NCAA Division I Men's Swimming and Diving Championships
NCAA Division I Swimming And Diving Championships
NCAA Division I Swimming And Diving Championships